Trusovo is a rural locality (a selo) and the administrative center of Trusovsky Selsoviet, Kuryinsky District, Altai Krai, Russia. The population was 607 as of 2013. There are 13 streets.

Geography 
Trusovo is located 20 km northeast of Kurya (the district's administrative centre) by road. Kalmatsky is the nearest rural locality.

References 

Rural localities in Kuryinsky District